Dion-Johan Chai Cools (born 4 June 1996) is a professional footballer who plays as a right back for Thai League 1 club Buriram United and the Malaysia national team. At club level, he has played in Belgium and Denmark for OH Leuven, Club Brugge and FC Midtjylland. 

Cools has represented Belgium at youth level with 28 caps, but chose to play for the Malaysian national football team at senior level. He made his senior debut for Malaysia on 3 June 2021.

Early life 
Cools was born to a Belgian father and Malaysian Chinese mother of Hakka descent in Kuching, Sarawak before the couple moved to Belgium after their marriage more than 20 years ago. He spent time with several Belgian clubs during his youth career before debuting in professional level with OH Leuven in 2014.

Club career

Early years
Cools started his career with Tempo Overijse, but soon moved to OH Leuven as a 9-year-old. In 2010, he joined the Anderlecht youth team. After a season, he returned to the OH Leuven youth academy in 2013. He signed his first professional contract with the club in July 2014 after completing secondary school.

OH Leuven
On 3 August 2014, Cools made his debut in the first team of OH Leuven, competing in the Belgian Second Division. He was in the starting lineup for the away match against Racing Mechelen. In May 2015, he participated with OH Leuven in the final round for promotion. Cools did not miss a single minute of the final round and won promotion to the Belgian First Division A again with the club.

Club Brugge
On 23 June 2015, Cools signed a four-year contract with Club Brugge. He won two Belgian national titles and twice the Belgian Super Cup. Cools became a starter under head coach Michel Preud'homme in the 2016–17 season due to poor performances by former Dutch international Ricardo van Rhijn, who had initially become the starter after the departure of regular right-back Thomas Meunier to Paris-Saint Germain. Cools also remained a starter under new coach Ivan Leko, with whom he was reunited after his time with OH Leuven. Cools would, however, later become benched after the emergence of Clinton Mata at the position.

Midtjylland
On 31 January 2020, Cools signed a three-year contract with Midtjylland in the Danish Superliga. He made his debut for the club on 17 February in a 2–0 win over Lyngby. Cools scored his first goal for the club on 14 February 2021, the only goal of the match in a win over Horsens in the Superliga. 

Cools and FC Midtjylland have mutually agreed to cancel his contract with the club on 9 September 2022, making him a free agent.

Zulte Waregem (loan)
On 4 January 2022, Cools was loaned out to Zulte Waregem by Midtjylland until the end of 2021–22 season as Cools was looking for more playing time, according to Midtjylland's director of football.

FK Jablonec 
On 12 September 2022, Cools has signed for Czech club FK Jablonec on a short-term deal. He stated that the motivation behind the move is to get more playing time as his former club, Midtjylland, decided to switch to a different playing system, which curtailed his  playing time.

International career
He was called up for 2015 UEFA European Under-19 Championship qualification by Belgian Under-19 national team coach, Gert Verheyen. He was also eligible to play for Malaysia through his mother's bloodline.

On 1 June 2021, Cools was announced as the newest addition to Malaysia's 26-man squad for the 2022 FIFA World Cup and 2023 AFC Asian Cup qualifiers match against the United Arab Emirates, after paperwork for his eligibility was completed with FIFA and the AFC. The owner of Johor Darul Ta'zim, Tunku Ismail Idris is said to play a significant role in convincing Cools to choose Malaysia as the national team he wanted to represent at the senior level. He debuted for Malaysia in a 4–0 loss to UAE on 3 June 2021.

Cools scored his first international goal in Malaysia's final AFC 2023 Asian Cup Qualifiers match against Bangladesh, helping Malaysia secure a 4–1 win, which confirmed Malaysia's AFC Asian Cup qualification for the first time by merit in 42 years. Cools was named as the man of the match.

Personal life 
Dion Cools and his girlfriend, Melissa Schelfhout had a child named Liam-Zayn Cools, before getting married on 6 May 2022.

Career statistics

Club

International

International goals
International senior goals

Honours
OH Leuven
 Belgian Second Division play-offs: 2015

Club Brugge
 Belgian First Division A: 2015–16, 2017–18
 Belgian Super Cup: 2016, 2018

Midtjylland
 Danish Superliga: 2019–20

References

External links

 Dion Cools at soccerstats247
 Dion Cools at ultimatealeague

1996 births
Living people
People from Kuching
Belgian people of Chinese descent
Malaysian people of Chinese descent
Malaysian people of Hakka descent
Malaysian footballers
Malaysia international footballers
Malaysian people of Belgian descent
Malaysian emigrants to Belgium
Belgian Pro League players
Challenger Pro League players
Dion Cools
Danish Superliga players
Oud-Heverlee Leuven players
R.S.C. Anderlecht players
Club Brugge KV players
FC Midtjylland players
S.V. Zulte Waregem players
Dion Cools
Association football fullbacks
Malaysian expatriate footballers
Expatriate men's footballers in Denmark
Expatriate footballers in Belgium
FK Jablonec players
Expatriate footballers in the Czech Republic
Belgian expatriate sportspeople in the Czech Republic